Georges Berger (14 September 1918 in Sint-Jans-Molenbeek, near Brussels – 23 August 1967 at the Nürburgring) was a racing driver who raced a Gordini in his two World Championship Formula One Grands Prix.

He initially competed during the 1950s in a Formula 2 BMW-engined Jicey with which he finished third in the Grand Prix des Frontières at Chimay. In 1953 he raced for the Simca-Gordini team and finished fifth at the same track. He entered the same car (a 1.5-litre 4 cylinder Gordini type 15) in the Belgian Grand Prix but retired after only three laps with engine failure. The following year he raced a Gordini with nothing more than a fourth position at Rouen.  After this he faded from single-seater racing.

Later in his career he shared the winning Ferrari at the 1960 Tour de France automobile. He was killed racing a Porsche 911 in the 1967 84-hour Marathon de la Route at Nürburgring.

Complete Formula One results
(key)

References

1918 births
1967 deaths
Belgian racing drivers
Belgian Formula One drivers
24 Hours of Le Mans drivers
Racing drivers who died while racing
Sport deaths in Germany
World Sportscar Championship drivers
24 Hours of Spa drivers
People from Molenbeek-Saint-Jean
Racing drivers from Brussels
20th-century Belgian people